Lenie Onzia (born 30 May 1989) is a former Belgian football midfielder. She played professionally in Belgium, England and the Netherlands.

Club career
She played for FC Twente and VVV-Venlo in the Dutch Eredivisie and Arsenal FC's reserves.

She was a member of OH Leuven in the renewed Belgian Women's Super League for the 2020-2022 seasons, ending both seasons as vice-champions behind RSC Anderlecht. Onzia played her last game for OHL on May 7, 2022 during a 5-2 victory over Standard Liège where she scored the 3rd OHL goal.

International career 
Onzia was a member of the Belgium U-17 and U-19 squads. She made her first appearance for the Red Flames on September 6, 2006 against Scotland. She was also a member of the Euro 2017 squad.

She made the preliminary squad list for the women's EURO 2022 championship.

Managerial career 
After missing out on the EURO 2022 finals, Onzia ended her active playing career and joined the Belgian squad as a staff member for the rest of the tournament.        
She subsequently joined the Belgium U-23 staff as assistant coach.

Career statistics

International

References

External links 
 

1989 births
Living people
Belgian women's footballers
Expatriate women's footballers in England
Expatriate women's footballers in the Netherlands
Women's association football midfielders
Arsenal W.F.C. players
FC Twente (women) players
VVV-Venlo (women) players
Eredivisie (women) players
Belgium women's international footballers
Footballers from Antwerp
Belgian expatriate sportspeople in the Netherlands
Belgian expatriate sportspeople in England
RSC Anderlecht (women) players
Lierse SK (women) players
Oud-Heverlee Leuven (women) players
K.A.A. Gent (women) players
BeNe League players
Super League Vrouwenvoetbal players
UEFA Women's Euro 2017 players